Acanthosaura capra is a species of  Agamid lizards: commonly known as the mountain horned dragon, it is also called the Indo-Chinese spiny lizard or the green pricklenape.

Distribution and description
A. capra can be found in the tropical forests of Cambodia (Mondolkiri) and southern Vietnam (Dong Nai, Khánh Hòa and Lâm Đồng provinces); reports of their presence in Laos are probably inaccurate.  They are diurnal and mostly arboreal and can be found in Cát Tiên National Park, where they can be distinguished from the commonly encountered A. coronata by their considerably more pronounced dorsal spines and nuchal crest.  Sexual dimorphism is not pronounced, with males having a slimmer and slightly tapered body than the females, which are broader-bodied.

References

External links 
 
 
The Reptile Database

Acanthosaura
Reptiles of Cambodia
Reptiles of Vietnam
Reptiles described in 1861
Taxa named by Albert Günther